Delmonte is a surname. Notable people with the surname include:

Armand Delmonte (1927—1981), Canadian ice hockey player
Francine DelMonte, American politician
Ishmael Del'Monte, Australian bridge player
Nicolás Delmonte (born 1989), Argentine footballer

See also
del Monte (surname)
Delmont (surname)